Jennifer Decker is an American politician from Kentucky. She is a Republican and represents District 58 in the State House.

In 2023, she sponsored HB470, an act that would deny gender transition services to minors in the state of Kentucky.

References 

Living people
Republican Party members of the Kentucky House of Representatives
21st-century American politicians
Year of birth missing (living people)
21st-century American women politicians
Women state legislators in Kentucky